Ayvalı may refer to:

Places
 Ayvalı, Çorum
 Ayvalı, İmamoğlu, a village in İmamoğlu district of Adana Province, Turkey
 Ayvalı, Oltu
 Ayvalı, Sinanpaşa, a village in Sinanpaşa district of Afyonkarahisar Province, Turkey
 Ayvalı, Vezirköprü, a village in Vezirköprü district of Samsun Province, Turkey 
 Ayvalı, Yüreğir, a village in the District of Yüreğir, Adana Province, Turkey

Other uses
 Ayvalı Dam, a dam in Kahramanmaraş Province, Turkey